Dichomeris lypetica is a moth in the family Gelechiidae. It was described by Walsingham in 1911. It is found in Mexico (Guerrero).

The forewings are brownish fuscous, very minutely speckled with pale cinereous and with a group of spots scarcely distinguishable in a slightly darker shade of brownish fuscous, the first discal spot a little preceding the plical. There is some obscure shading which faintly indicates an ante-terminal band, bowed outward at its middle, and a terminal line preceding the pale cinereous cilia which are much mixed with fuscous. The hindwings are pale cinereous.

References

Moths described in 1911
lypetica